BBC Look North is the BBC's TV news service for East Yorkshire and Lincolnshire, produced by BBC Yorkshire and Lincolnshire. The programmes are produced and broadcast from the BBC Broadcasting Centre at Queens Court in Kingston upon Hull, East Yorkshire, with reporters also based in Lincoln.

Peter Levy is the main presenter/newsreader on the 18:30 and 22:25 weekday bulletins, whilst lunchtime and early morning bulletins are presented by different journalists.

The programme can be watched in any part of the UK (and Europe) from Astra 2E on Freesat channel 967 and Sky channel 957, and in select areas on Virgin Media channel 858. The latest edition of Look North is also available to watch on the BBC iPlayer.

Broadcasts
On weekdays, Look North broadcasts six three-minute opt-outs during BBC Breakfast at 27 and 57 minutes past each hour – as of June 2016, the bulletins are also shared with Look North'''s sister service in Yorkshire and the North Midlands, as part of a pilot scheme. These bulletins originally came from the BBC's Hull studios, but now they come from the BBC's Leeds studios. 

A 15-minute lunchtime news airs at 1.30 pm, before the main half-hour edition at 6:30 pm. and a 15-minute bulletin shown at 10:25 pm, following the BBC News at Ten.Look North also airs three bulletins during the weekend: early evening bulletins on Saturday and Sunday and a late night bulletin on Sundays, following the BBC News at Ten. The times of these bulletins vary.

Coverage area
The programme's main coverage area is East Yorkshire and Lincolnshire, the editorial areas covered by BBC Lincolnshire and BBC Radio Humberside. Some households in rural north-west Norfolk receive the Hull edition of Look North.

HistoryLook Norths Hull-based programme began in November 2002, presented by Helen Fospero and Peter Levy. The programme was presented from a small television studio built into the existing BBC Radio Humberside building on Chapel Street and was directed from a technical gallery at Leeds. The programme's first editor was Roger Farrant.

Before 11 November 2002, this region was part of a BBC North region, served by Look North from Leeds with short six-minute opt-outs for the area (introduced during 2001) during the main evening programme at 6:30 pm and the BBC Ten O' Clock News. The November 2002 changes saw the opt extended to become a full half-hour programme at 6:30 pm, with the 10:25 pm opt-out remaining unchanged. Daytime and weekend bulletins were carried from Leeds.

In 2004, Look North'', along with BBC Radio Humberside and the Online/Interactive Project, moved to new studios and offices in Queen's Gardens. Within a short time of going live from the new studios, dedicated daytime and weekend bulletins for the region were introduced, replacing the previous arrangement of carrying bulletins from Leeds.

Presenters

News
Peter Levy - Main Presenter - Monday-Friday
Caroline Bilton - Friday late Presenter

Weather
Keeley Donovan
Paul Hudson

Reporters

Videojournalists
Caroline Bilton

Correspondents
Simon Clark - Sport

Former on air team
 Sarah Cruddas
 Helen Fospero 
 Hannah Moffat
 Damian Johnson (Presented Sport round up on Mondays)

References

External links
 

BBC Regional News shows
East Riding of Yorkshire
Mass media in Kingston upon Hull
Mass media in Lincolnshire
Mass media in Yorkshire
2010s British television series
2020s British television series
2002 British television series debuts
English-language television shows
Television news in England
Television news program articles using incorrect naming style